The Holy See nuncio in Taipei is the official representative of the government in Vatican City to the government of Taiwan.

List of representatives

Apostolic delegates to China (1922–1946)
In 1922 Celso Benigno Luigi Costantini was appointed by the Holy See as Apostolic Delegate to China, without diplomatic status.

Apostolic internuncios to China (1946–1966)

Apostolic nuncios to China (1966–present)

Chargés d'affaires

References 

Holy See
Apostolic nuncio
China